Jason Ziyaphapha Moyo (1927–1977) was founder of the Zimbabwe People's Revolutionary Army (ZIPRA).

Jason was born in Plumtree to a Kalanga family. Having trained as a builder Jason, became interested in trade unionism in Bulawayo in the early 1950s and became General Secretary of the African Artisans’ Union. He joined the Bulawayo Branch of the old ANCongress and became successively its Secretary and its Chairman

The JZ Moyo High School was named after him.
A major road in Harare, Zimbabwe, Jason Moyo Avenue is named after him.

Death
Moyo was killed on 22 January 1977 by a parcel bomb which he handled at the Lusaka offices of the African National Congress. The parcel appeared to be sent from a woman known to Moyo, living in Botswana. However in an enquiry sponsored by Joshua Nkomo and carried out by Gibson Mayisa, she was cleared as the parcel had not come from there.

References

1927 births
1977 deaths
Zimbabwe People's Revolutionary Army personnel